Voice of Africa FM, commonly referred to simply as Voice, is a commercial radio station broadcasting on  FM from Kololo hill in Kampala, Uganda.

Founded in 2001 by the Union of Muslim Councils for East, Central and Southern Africa (UMC), Voice of Africa was the first Moslem radio station in the country, and it was supported monetarily by Libya's then supreme leader, Muammar al-Gaddafi, and a US$39,000 donation from Ugandan businessman Hassan Basajjabalaba. When the station launched, it was criticized for playing music, but it became known and accepted for playing Muslim artists and music that was considered acceptable for Muslims to listen to.

The station is officially registered as LLC, Voice of Africa Ltd., and it operates under the supervision of the Uganda Communications Commission (UCC).

After Gaddafi's death, the station fell into financial strife with some programmes being funded by individual Muslims. The station has approximately 20 employees with Najib Kivumbi serving as its Executive Manager.

Since 2019, Voice of Africa has partnered with pay-TV service GOtv Africa on activities to mark Ramadan including radio quizzes, visits to area mosques for iftar, and an Eid al-Fitr celebration at the end of the month.

References

Radio stations in Uganda